École Pierre-Chiasson is a Canadian francophone school in Deblois, Prince Edward Island. Students that attend the school come from the central parts of Prince County.

The school is administratively part of the Commission scolaire de langue française.

References

See also
List of schools in Prince Edward Island
List of school districts in Prince Edward Island

High schools in Prince Edward Island
Education in Prince County, Prince Edward Island
Educational institutions in Canada with year of establishment missing